Curt Gerhard Westphal, stage name Gert Westphal, (5 October 1920 – 10 November 2002) was a German-Swiss actor, audiobook narrator, recitator and director, one of the best-known audiobook narrators and speakers in German, described as "König der Vorleser" (king of reciters) and "der Caruso der Vorleser" (the Caruso of reciters).  After his reading of her husband's works, Katia Mann called him "des Dichters oberster Mund" (the poet's principal voice). The literary critic Marcel Reich-Ranicki said he was probably the best reciter of German.

Career 

Born in Dresden as the son of a culturally interested factory director, Westphal attended the Realgymnasium in Blasewitz, graduating with the Abitur. He trained in acting with Paul Hoffmann at the Dresdner Staatsschauspielhaus, where he made his stage debut in 1940 in a minor role in Goethe's Götz von Berlichingen. He was then drafted for military service and later became a prisoner of war. Starting in 1948, he headed that broadcaster's radio drama division. In 1953, he took the same position with Südwestfunk in Baden-Baden where he remained until 1959. He was in contact with authors such as Alfred Andersch, Ingeborg Bachmann, Gottfried Benn, Max Frisch and Carl Zuckmayer. He commissioned new radio dramas and collaborated with Max Ophüls, Will Quadflieg, Hans Paetsch, Oskar Werner, Walter Jens and Joachim Fest.

As a reciter and audiobook narrator, Westphal recorded major works by German authors, and also translations of writers such as Gustave Flaubert, Victor Hugo, Henry James and Thornton Wilder, with a focus on Russian literature by Chinghiz Aitmatov, Fjodor Dostojewski, Nikolai Gogol, Ivan Goncharov, Maxim Gorki, Nikolai Leskov, Vladimir Nabokov, Leo Tolstoi and Anton Checkov, among others. In 1994, he performed along with Dietrich Fischer-Dieskau in a series of readings of correspondence, such as between Hofmannsthal and Strauss, and between Zelter and Goethe.

He died in Zürich and was buried in Kilchberg, next to the family grave of Thomas Mann.

Awards 
 1975: Literature prize of Kanton Zürich
 1982: Officer's Cross of the Order of Merit of the Federal Republic of Germany

 2001: Biermann-Ratjen-Medaille, for cultural achievements for Hamburg

Awards for recordings 
 Preis der deutschen Schallplattenkritik
 Ehrenurkunde, 1991, as the first and so far only speaker*

  by Ingeborg Bachmann, 2001
 Bekenntnisse des Hochstaplers Felix Krull by Thomas Mann, 2002

Awards for audio plays 
 Hörspielpreis der Kriegsblinden for Prinzessin Turandot by Wolfgang Hildesheimer, 1955 (direction)
 Karl-Sczuka-Preis for Ungeduld des Herzens by Stefan Zweig, music by Peter Zwetkoff, 1961 (direction)
 Prix Italia for A hard day's night by Anders Bodelsen, 1967 (direction)

Literature 
 
 Oliver W. Grabow: Gert Westphal. Gesamtverzeichnis seiner Arbeiten von 1940 bis 2002. Arethousa Verlag, München 2013, .
 Katrin Krämer: Vorlesen ist ein Liebesakt. Gert Westphal – Die Stimme der Literatur, biographic feature, Radio Bremen 2000, aired 22 November 2015

References

External links 

 
 
 
 Gert Westphal zum 90. Geburtstag Radio Bremen
 "Lyrik und Jazz": Der Groove von Heinrich Heine Der Spiegel  13 September 2006

1920 births
2002 deaths
Actors from Dresden
20th-century German male actors
Audiobook narrators
Audio directors
Officers Crosses of the Order of Merit of the Federal Republic of Germany
German emigrants to Switzerland
German prisoners of war in World War II
German male voice actors